Eri may refer to:

People 
 Eri (biblical figure)
 Eri (given name), a Japanese feminine given name, including lists of people and fictional characters
 Eri (king), the progenitor of the Umu-Eri and Umu-Nri-Igbo ancient Nigerian city-states
 Eri D. Woodbury (1837–1928), Union Army officer during the American Civil War
 Eri Marina Yo (born 1987), Indonesian inline speed skater
 Chiemi Eri (1937–1982), Japanese singer and actress
 Vincent Eri (1936–1993), Governor General of Papua New Guinea

Other uses 
 Eri silk, a type of silk
 Eri-TV, an Eritrean television network
 Earthquake Research Institute, University of Tokyo
 Edinburgh Royal Infirmary, a hospital in Edinburgh, Scotland
 Eldorado Resorts, an American gaming company
 Electrical resistivity imaging
 Empowerment and Rights Institute, a Chinese human rights organization
 Energy and Resources Institute, an Indian research institute
 Eridanus (constellation)
 Erie International Airport in Pennsylvania, United States
 Eritrea
 Eri, the collar of a kimono
 EarthRights International, an American nonprofit human rights organization

See also
 Ériu, in Irish mythology, one of the patron goddesses of Ireland
 Eri, a young girl in My Hero Academia